The Sr1 is a class of electric locomotives built for VR of Finland. These 25 kV locomotives were built in the Soviet Union at the Novocherkassk Electric Locomotive Factory between 1973 and 1985. Two additional locomotives of this class were built at the VR Hyvinkää Machine Workshop in 1993 and 1995, number 3111 from spare parts and number 3112 from the original prototype locomotive (number 3000) that was never used by the VR. The official classification given by the manufacturer is VL70 or ES40.

The nicknames for these locomotives are "Siperian susi" (Wolf of Siberia; in Finnish slang "susi" can also mean a poorly manufactured object, compare English "dog" or "lemon"), "Kaalihäkki" (Cabbage Cage) and "Sähköryssä" (Electric Russkie).

History 
In 1970, Valtionrautatiet ordered 27 electric locomotives from Energomachexport, which were delivered between September 1973 and the end of the year 1975. 82 additional locomotives were ordered and delivered between 1973 and 1985. The first prototype locomotive, number 3000, was bought from the constructor in 1994 by VR, which rebuilt it into number 3112.

The trains have been used in passenger and cargo transport on Finland's electrified rail network.

A list of overall locomotives made is shown below:

Livery 
The locomotives originally carried a dark red livery, with light yellow stripes around and below the cab windows. The stripes were later replaced with yellow warning panels (resembling stylised wings) below the cab windows. From the early 1990s onwards this livery was replaced by an off-white livery with red stripes. Nowadays the locomotives are refitted with a white-green livery to go with the current company colours.

Technical information 
Electrical equipment for the locomotives was supplied by the Finnish company Oy Strömberg (later part of ABB).

Locomotives number 3098–3110 were rebuilt with new bogies allowing a higher maximum speed (160 km/h) in the 1990s (3111 and 3112 were originally built for this speed), but since 2003 they have been restored back to the original top speed due to the speed being raised at the expense of tractive effort (possibly the delivery of the faster Sr2 class also had an effect). The last Sr1 to be equipped with bogies allowing 160 km/h was number 3107.

Incidents and accidents 

Three Sr1 class locomotives have been damaged beyond repair and withdrawn from service: number 3048 in Jokela in 1996, number 3089 in Jyväskylä in 1998 and number 3101 in Siuro in 2011. Five other locomotives have also been involved in accidents, but have been rebuilt or repaired afterwards.

Withdrawal and replacement
In December 2013 VR announced an order for 80 new electric locomotives to replace the Sr1 Class. The new locomotives, of the Siemens Vectron design, will be built in Germany by Siemens. The new locomotives are scheduled to be delivered between 2017 and 2026, resulting in the withdrawal of the Sr1 class.

See also

VR Class Sr2
VR Class Sr3

References

Literature

External links
 
Photographs of VR Sr1 locomotives
Further photographs from Railfaneurope.net
Railway Gazette: new locomotives to replace Sr1 class, December 2013

Bo′Bo′ locomotives
Sr1
25 kV AC locomotives
Electric locomotives of Finland
Railway locomotives introduced in 1973
5 ft gauge locomotives